Cody is a unisex given name. Spellings include Codi, Codie, Kodi, Kodie, and Kody. Other variants are Coady and Codey. Cody is also a surname.

According to A Dictionary of First Names, Cody is "a transferred use of the Irish surname, an Anglicized form of Gaelic O'Cuidighthigh meaning 'descendant of Cuidightheach' (originally a byname for a helpful person), or of Mac Óda 'son of Óda' (a personal name of uncertain origin)".

In the United States, the name Cody is often associated with the west, specifically California.

People with the given name Cody, Codee, Codi, Codie, Kodi, Kodie, and Kody include:

Single name
Kody (born 1978), Belgian television host

A
Kody Afusia (born 1992), American former football player
Cody Allen (born 1988), American baseball player
Cody Almond (born 1989), Canadian-Swiss ice hockey player
Cody Anderson (disambiguation), multiple people
Cody Andrews (born 1987), New Zealand cricketer
Cody Arens (born 1993), American actor 
Cody Arnoux (born 1988), American soccer player
Cody Asche (born 1990), American baseball player

B
Cody Baker (born 2004), American soccer player
Cody Balogh (born 1986), American football player
Cody Barton (born 1996), American football player
Cody Bass (born 1987), Canadian ice hockey player
Kodie Bedford, Australian screenwriter
Cody Bellinger (born 1995), American baseball player
Cody Blackbird, American musician
Kody Bliss (born 1985), American football player
Kody Blois (born 1991), Canadian politician
Cody Bragg (born 1980), American soccer player
Cody Brookwell (born 1986), Canadian ice hockey player
Cody Brown (born 1986), American football player
Cody Burger (born 1983), American actor

C
Cody Calafiore (born 1990), American television personality
Cody Cameron (born 1970), American voice actor
Cody Canada (born 1976), American musician
Cody Carlson (born 1963), American football player
Cody Carnes (born 1989), American musician
Cody Carpenter (born 1984), American musician
Cody Carroll (born 1992), American baseball player
Cody Cassidy (born 1981), Canadian wrestler
Cody Ceci (born 1993), Canadian ice hockey player
Cody Chesnutt (born 1968), American musician
Cody Chetty (born 1991), South African cricketer
Cody Christian (born 1995), American actor
Cody Cillo (born 1980), American baseball player
Cody Clark (disambiguation), multiple people
Coty Clarke (born 1992), American basketball
Cody Claver (born 1996), Dutch footballer
Kody Clemens (born 1996), American baseball player
Cody Cole (born 1990), New Zealand weightlifter
Cody Collier (born 1985), American radio personality
Cody Connelly (born 1987), American motorcycle builder
Cody Cooke (born 1993), English footballer
Cody Core (born 1994), American football player
Cody Coughlin (born 1995), American stock car racing driver
Cody Crocker (born 1971), Australian stock car racing driver
Cody Cropper (born 1993), American football player
Cody Crowley (born 1993), Canadian boxer
Kodie Curran (born 1989), Canadian ice hockey player

D
Cody Davis (born 1999), American entrepreneur
Cody Deal (born 1986), American actor
Cody Deaner (born 1982), Canadian professional wrestler
Cody Decker (born 1987), American baseball player
Cody Demps (born 1993), American basketball player
Cody Donovan (born 1981), American Jiu-Jitsu practitioner
Cody Drameh (born 2001), English footballer
Cody Durden (born 1991), American mixed martial artist

E
Cody Eakin (born 1991), Canadian ice hockey player
Cody Ege (born 1991), American baseball player
Cody Ellis (born 1990), Australian basketball player
Cody Eppley (born 1985), American baseball player
Cody Erickson (born 1988), American stock car racing driver
Cody Estes (born 1994), American actor

F
Cody Fajardo (born 1992), American football player
Cody Ford (born 1997), American football player
Cody Forsythe (born 1990), American baseball player
Cody Fowler (1892–1978), American lawyer
Cody Franson (born 1987), Canadian ice hockey player
Cody Fry, American singer-songwriter

G
Cody Gakpo (born 1999), Dutch footballer
Codi Galloway, American politician
Cody Garbrandt (born 1991), American mixed martial artist
Cody Gibson (born 1987), American mixed martial artist
Cody Glass (born 1999), Canadian ice hockey player
Cody Glenn (born 1986), American football player
Cody Goloubef (born 1989), Canadian ice hockey player
Cody Grace (born 1996), Australian-Canadian football player
Cody Gribble (born 1990), American golfer
Cody Grimm (born 1987), American football player
Cody Groat, Canadian historian

H
Cody Hall (born 1991), American professional wrestler
Cody Hall (baseball) (born 1988), American baseball player
Cody Hanson (born 1982), American musician
Cody Harris (disambiguation), multiple people
Cody Hawkins (born 1988), American football player
Cody Hay (born 1983), Canadian figure skater
Cody Henson, American politician
Codi Heuer (born 1996), American baseball player
Cody Hodgson (born 1990), Canadian ice hockey player
Kody Hoese (born 1997), American baseball player
Cody Hoffman (born 1991), American football player
Cody Hollister (born 1993), American football player
Cody Horlacher (born 1987), American politician
Cody Horn (born 1988), American actress and model

J
Cody Jamieson (born 1987), Canadian lacrosse player
Cody Jinks (born 1980), American singer-songwriter
Cody Johnson (born 1987), American singer-songwriter
Cody Johnson (footballer), English footballer
Cody Jones (born 1951), American football player

K
Cody Kasch (born 1987), American actor
Cody Kearsley, Canadian actor
Cody Keenan (born 1980/1981), American politician
Kody Keplinger (born 1991), American author
Cody Kessler (born 1993), American football player
Cody Kilby, American musician
Cody Ko (born 1990), Canadian internet personality
Cody Kolodziejzyk (born 1990), Canadian comedian
Cody Kukuk (born 1993), American baseball player
Cody Kunyk (born 1990), Canadian ice hockey player

L
Cody Lambert (born 1961), American cowboy
Cody Lampl (born 1986), American-German ice hockey player
Cody Lane (born 1996), American stock car racing driver
Cody Lang (born 1993), American soccer player
Cody Lange (born 1994), Australian netball player
Cody Larsen (born 1987), American football player
Cody Lassen, American theatre producer
Cody Latimer (born 1992), American football player
Cody Laurendi (born 1988), Puerto Rican baseball player
Cody Law (born 1995), American mixed martial artist
Cody Ledbetter (1973–2015), American football player
Cody Legebokoff (born 1990), Canadian serial killer
Cody Lightning (born 1986), Canadian actor
Cody Linley (born 1989), American actor
Cody Longo (1988–2023), American actor
Kody Lostroh (born 1985), American professional rodeo cowboy
Cody Lundin (born 1967), American survival trainer

M
Cody Mandell (born 1992), American football player
Cody Martin (disambiguation), multiple people
Cody Mattern (born 1981), American fencer
Cody Mauch (born 1999), American football player
Cody Maynard (born 1986), American politician
Cody McCormick (born 1983), Canadian ice hockey player
Cody McDonald (born 1986), English footballer
Cody McKay (born 1974), Canadian baseball player
Cody McKenzie (born 1987), American mixed martial artist
Cody McLeod (born 1984), Canadian ice hockey player
Cody McMahan (born 1991), American stock car racing driver
Cody McMains (born 1985), American actor
Cody Meakin (born 1989), Australian wheelchair basketball player
Cody Melphy (born 1993), American rugby union footballer
Cody Michaels, American professional wrestler
Cody Miles (born 1991), American rapper
Cody Miller (born 1992), American swimmer
Codi Miller-McIntyre (born 1994), American basketball player
Cody Mitchell (born 1986), American politician
Cody Mizell (born 1991), American soccer player
Cody Morissette (born 2000), American baseball player

N
Cody Nelson (born 1988), Australian rugby league footballer
Cody Nickson (born 1985), American radio personality

O
Cody O'Connell (born 1994), American football player

P
Cody Parkey (born 1992), American football player
Cody Pearcy (born 1989), American football player
Cody Pfister (born 1990), American mixed martial artist
Cody Pickett (born 1980), American football player
Cody Ponce (born 1994), American baseball player
Cody Poteet (born 1994), American baseball player
Codie Prevost (born 1984), Canadian musician
Cody Prewitt (born 1992), American football player
Cody Prior (born 1999), Irish footballer

R
Cody Ramsey (born 2000), Australian rugby league footballer
Cody Ransom (born 1976), American baseball player
Cody Reed (born 1993), American baseball player
Cody Reeder, American internet personality
Cody Reichard (born 1987), American ice hockey player
Cody Rhodes (born 1985), American professional wrestler
Cody Renard Richard (born 1988), American stage manager
Cody Riggs (born 1991), American football player
Cody Rigsby (born 1987), American fitness instructor
Cody Riley (born 1997), American basketball player
Cody Risien (born 1957), American football player
Cody Rogers, American politician
Cody Ross (born 1980), American baseball player
Cody Rudkowsky (born 1978), Canadian ice hockey player

S
Cody Satterwhite (born 1987), American baseball player
Cody Scarpetta (born 1988), American baseball player
Cody Sedlock (born 1995), American baseball player
Coty Sensabaugh (born 1988), American football player
Kodie Shane (born 1998), American rapper
Cody Simpson (born 1997), Australian singer
Cody Slate (born 1987), American football player
Cody Smith, American politician
Kodi Smit-McPhee (born 1996), Australian actor
Cody Blue Snider (born 1989), American screenwriter
Cody Sorensen (born 1986), Canadian bobsledder
Cody Speller (born 1994), Canadian football player
Cody Spencer (born 1981), American football player
Cody Stamann (born 1989), American mixed martial artist
Cody Stanley (born 1988), American baseball player
Cody Sun (born 1997), Canadian professional gamer
Kody Swanson (born 1988), American racing driver

T
Cody Thomas (born 1994), American football player
Cody Thompson (disambiguation), multiple people
Cody Toppert (born 1983), American basketball player
Cody Trahan (born 1988), American softball player
Cody Ray Turner (born 1987), American adult actor

V
Kody Vanderwal (born 2001), American stock car racing driver
Cody Vasut (born 1987), American politician
Cody Votolato (born 1982), American musician

W
Kody Wakasa (born 1994), American former soccer player
Cody Walker (disambiguation), multiple people
Cody Wallace (born 1984), American football player
Cody Ware (born 1995), American auto racing driver
Cody Webb (born 1988), American motorcycle racer
Cody Webster (born 1991), American football player
Cody Weightman (born 2001), Australian rules footballer
Cody Westman (born 1978), Canadian filmmaker
Cody White (disambiguation), multiple people
Cody Whitehair (born 1992), American football player
Cody Wichmann (born 1992), American football player
Cody Wild (born 1987), American ice hockey player
Cody Willard (born 1972), American journalist
Cody Wilson (born 1988), American activist
Cody Wilson (baseball) (born 1996), American baseball player
Cody Wise (born 1995), American singer
Cody Wong Hong-yi (born 2002), Hong Kong tennis player
Cody Wood (born 1984), American actor

Y
Cody Yerkovich, New Zealand model
Codi Yusuf (born 1998), South African cricketer

Z
Cody Zeller (born 1992), American basketball player

Fictional characters
Cody Madison, television series character from Baywatch
Cody Martin, television series character of The Suite Life of Zack and Cody and The Suite Life on Deck
Cody Willis, a character on the Australian soap opera Neighbours

See also
Coady, a disambiguation page for "Coady"
Codey, a disambiguation page for "Codey"
Codi (disambiguation), a disambiguation page for "Codi"
Cody (surname), a page for people with the surname "Cody"
Coty (disambiguation), a disambiguation page for "Coty"
Kodi (disambiguation), a disambiguation page for "Kodi"
Koty (disambiguation), a disambiguation page for "Koty"

References

English unisex given names
English masculine given names
English feminine given names
Irish unisex given names 
Irish masculine given names
Irish feminine given names